Bobby Hoying (born September 20, 1972) is a former college and professional American football quarterback. He is the grandson of baseball player Wally Post, who played 15 years in the Major Leagues.  Post was an outfielder for the Cincinnati Reds 1961 National League pennant winning team.

High school career
Hoying grew up in Mercer County, Ohio, attending St. Henry High School, where he won one football and two basketball state championships. He had college basketball offers from the University of Toledo and other colleges.

College career
Hoying played college football for the Ohio State Buckeyes.  In 1993 as a sophomore he was named  starting quarterback, but shared snaps with Bret Powers a transfer from Arizona State.  By 1994, Hoying acquired firm hold on the starting spot.

In his career at Ohio State Hoying completed 498 passes and 57 touchdown passes, both school records.  He is third behind J. T. Barrett and Art Schlichter on the Ohio State career passing yardage list.  He was an outstanding college student and was selected as an All Big 10 Scholar Athlete.

Hoying was selected to the Ohio State Varsity O Hall of Fame in 2008.

Career passing statistics

Professional career

Hoying was drafted in the third round of the 1996 NFL Draft by the Philadelphia Eagles. Hoying played well in two games in 1997 after taking over the starting role at midseason and throwing 11 touchdown passes. He won a memorable 44–42 shootout win over Boomer Esiason and the Cincinnati Bengals after throwing four touchdown passes.

The following year however, would be a complete disaster for Hoying as he was benched midseason after not winning a single game as a starter. He did not throw a touchdown pass and threw nine interceptions. The 3–13 season led to the firing of Eagles head coach Ray Rhodes and ultimately the hiring of Andy Reid. Reid drafted Donovan McNabb out of Syracuse University and Hoying was traded to the Oakland Raiders in August 1999, rejoining coach Jon Gruden who had been the offensive coordinator for the Eagles under Rhodes. Hoying served as a backup to Rich Gannon in his first season with Oakland. In 2000 Hoying would play in the AFC Championship game against the Baltimore Ravens standing in for the injured Gannon, but his team lost the game 3–16.  Hoying retired after the 2001 season following a severe elbow injury. He holds the NFL record for most pass completions in a season without a touchdown. 

Since leaving professional football Hoying has become a principal at Crawford Hoying, a full-service real estate company based in Columbus, Ohio.

References

External links
 Crawford Hoying

1972 births
Living people
American football quarterbacks
Oakland Raiders players
Ohio State Buckeyes football players
Philadelphia Eagles players
William V. Campbell Trophy winners
People from St. Henry, Ohio
Players of American football from Ohio